Rasmus Prehn (born 18 June 1973 in Høje-Taastrup) is a Danish politician who is currently serving as the Minister for Food, Agriculture and Fisheries. He previously served as Minister for Development Cooperation from 2019 to 2020. He has been a member of the Folketing since the 2005 Danish general election.

Background
Prehn was born in Høje-Taastrup to Flemming Prehn and Birte Hanne Prehn, and is married to Heidi Linnemann Prehn. He studied at Aalborg University and the University of Leeds, graduating with a Master's degree in social science.

Political career
Prehn has been a member of Folketinget for the Social Democrats since the 2005 national elections. During his time in parliament, he served as chairman of the Committee on Research, Education and Further Education. 

Prehn was appointed Minister for Development Cooperation in the Frederiksen Cabinet on 27 June 2019. In this capacity, he pledged a total of US$51 million in contributions of Denmark to Global Fund to Fight AIDS, Tuberculosis and Malaria for the 2020-2022 period.

In 2022 it was revealed the Prehn had used his ministerial credit card to pay for a dinner in 2020 which he stated had been with journalist Søren Wormslevs. Wormslevs denied ever having dined with Prehn, and Prehn confirmed he had never dined with Wormslevs. As a result of the scandal, the state accountants decided that all ministers use of their ministerial credit cards from 2015 and onward was to be investigated. Prehn said it saddened him that he had contributed to the investigation being launched.

Also in 2022, Prehn was re-elected as Member of the Folketing, though with only a third of the votes he got in 2019.

Personal life 
Prehn has three children. One of his children, Nikoline Prehn (born 2002), is also a Social Democrat, and was a candidate in the 2022 election, but did not get a seat.

References

External links 
 Biography on the website of the Danish Parliament (Folketinget)

|-

1973 births
Living people
People from Høje-Taastrup Municipality
Government ministers of Denmark
Social Democrats (Denmark) politicians
Members of the Folketing 2005–2007
Members of the Folketing 2007–2011
Members of the Folketing 2011–2015
Members of the Folketing 2015–2019
Members of the Folketing 2019–2022
Members of the Folketing 2022–2026